The terms special edition, limited edition, and variants such as deluxe edition, or collector's edition, are used as a marketing incentive for various kinds of products, originally published products related to the arts, such as books, prints, recorded music and films, and videogames, but now including clothing, cars, fine wine, and whisky, among other products.  A limited edition is restricted in the number of copies produced, although in fact the number may be very low or very high. Suzuki (2008) defines limited edition products as those “sold in a state that makes them difficult to obtain because of companies limiting their availability to a certain period, quantity, region, or channel". A special edition implies there is extra material of some kind included.  The term is frequently used on DVD film releases, often when the so-called "special" edition is actually the only version released.

Collector's edition
Collector's edition may just be another term for special edition and limited edition products that include additional features or items that regular versions do not have. When referring to books, collector's edition products may refer to books in special limited and numbered editions, sometimes hand-bound, and signed by the artist and containing one or more original works or prints produced directly from their work and printed under their supervision. Whatever these extra features or items are, they must represent additional value to collectors of these products.

Hand Finishing 
Many collector's editions include hand finished elements to further enhance the finished product above and beyond what a machine could create.

Tipped In Pages 
For elements such as signatures and autographs or tipped-in plates for illustrations, tipped in pages are pages of the book that are printed separately from the main body of the book, but then attached to it.

Onlays 
Onlays are materials that adhere directly to the overall binding material of the book and are another key feature of many special editions.

Disc products
Popular culture widely employs Special, Deluxe, Expanded and  Limited Edition  in marketing, releasing subsequent, improved versions of film DVDs, music, and video games. Companies widely use special editions and incremental improvements to sell the same products to consumers multiple times. This has been seen in the 10th Anniversary edition of Titanic, which simply consists of the first two discs of the previous Special Collector's edition, only with new packaging, and on CD with the 30 Year Anniversary Edition of Bob Marley's Exodus, which has exactly the same content as the original album, but in new packaging.

In many cases, successful film releases have had items made in limited numbers. These "limited editions" usually contain the best DVD edition possible of a film with special items in a box set, sometimes containing items available only in the limited edition. Items marked thus are often (but not always) released for a shorter time and in lower quantity than common editions, often with a running number (e.g. "13055 of 20000") printed on the products to boost the rarity feel, as the company implies not to manufacture more. It is also common to have such items packaged with unique designs.

With the success of DVDs, special editions of films themselves (instead of just special editions of film DVDs) have also become fairly common. Sharing similarities with the concept of a director's cut (another long-suffering inflation-by-marketing term). These generally feature additional in-movie material. The material may be footage originally deleted from the final cut, or new digitally-created, interpolated content. Unlike true director's cuts, the directors may not have had part in such projects, such as in Superman II: The Richard Donner Cut, in which Richard Donner did not help create the new version, just supply the material. The Doctor Who television movie The Five Doctors was edited, recut, amongst various other changes, to make the "Special Edition" in 1999 for the first DVD release of the episode.

Limited edition prints 

Limited edition prints, also known as LEs, have been standard in printmaking from the nineteenth century onwards. A limit to the print run is crucial, as many traditional printmaking techniques can only produce a limited number of best quality impressions.  This can be as few as ten or twenty for a technique like drypoint, but more commonly would be in the low hundreds - print runs of over a thousand are regarded as dubious by the serious art market for original prints, even though with many techniques there is no loss of quality.

Edition sizes higher than about 500 are likely to be of print reproductions of paintings, of much less value, though some modern techniques blur this traditional distinction. As in other fields, the use of the concept has become largely driven by marketing imperatives, and has been misused in parts of the market. In particular, lithographic, photogravure, rotogravure, and giclee reproductions of prints, derived from photographs of an original print, which are most unlikely to have any investment value, are often issued in limited editions implying that they will have such value. These need to be distinguished from the original artist's print, carefully produced directly from his work, and printed under the artist's supervision.

Consumer protection 

In UK and New Zealand the Fine Art Trade Guild ensures the quality and verification of limited edition prints by employing a number of strictly administered regulations for all processes and aspects related to them.

In the United States limited editions are regulated under state consumer protections laws. California became the first state to regulate the sale of limited edition art prints with the "California Print Law" of 1971. The state of Illinois later expanded on the California statute. However, it was not until 1986 that more comprehensive provisions, still in place today, were enacted with the passage of the "Georgia Print Law". That law became the template for statutes subsequently enacted by other states. The Georgia Print Law written by (former) State Representative Chesley V. Morton, became effective July 1, 1986. The law requires art dealers, artists, or auctioneers to supply information to prospective purchasers about the nature of the print, the number of prints and editions (including HC editions) produced, and the involvement (if any) of the artist in the creation of the print. The penalty for violation of the law ranges from simple reimbursement to treble damages, in the case of a willful violation. Those found to be in violation of the law are also liable for court costs, expenses, and attorney fees. The law applies to works of art valued at more than $100.00 (not including frame). Charitable organizations are specifically exempt from the provision of the law.  The statute of limitations is one year after discovery, and, if discovery of the violation is not made within three years of the sale, then the purchaser's remedies are extinguished.

A limited edition is normally hand signed and numbered by the artist, typically in pencil, in the form (e.g.): 14/100.  The first number is the number of the print itself.  The second number is the number of overall prints the artist will print of that image.  The lower the second number is, the more valuable and collectible the limited editions are likely to be, within whatever their price range is.  A small number of "artists' proofs" may also be produced as well, signed and with "AP", "proof", etc. Prints that are given to someone or are for some reason unsuitable for sale are marked "H. C." or "H/C", meaning "hors de commerce", not for sale.

Music 

In terms of musical albums, the term "deluxe edition" refers to a re-release of an album, generally a sufficient period after the initial release, featuring extra content related to the album. From the 2000s it has become commonplace for a deluxe edition to be released at the same time as the standard edition. The deluxe edition often includes some or all of the following: extra tracks; demo recordings of album tracks; live recordings of album tracks; alternate takes, mixes, or edits of album tracks; B-sides from album singles that did not appear on the album; DVD content, including music videos. These editions are commonly repackaged, with the new content on a second disc and many feature additional liner notes.

Also, some albums are initially released in two editions, a regular retail version and a "special" or "limited" version in distinctive packaging and often including extras such as a second disc, a video DVD, or liner notes expanded into a hardback book. Generally, the special package is only produced for the first pressing or a set number of copies - some are limited to only being sold at one chain of retailers. It is important to distinguish this from an expanded re-release, since those are generally available widely and for a long period of time.

Milking
Milking, or double-dipping, refers to the practice of releasing multiple editions of the same product (usually a CD, DVD, or Blu-ray), simultaneously or at different times, with the purpose of enticing consumers to buy more than one edition. This can be done with, for example, a special edition, a director's cut, an ultimate edition, and a collector's edition, sometimes with different features or supplementary material.

The consumer may be persuaded to purchase multiple editions, with the belief that the additional features or content will be worth paying for a product that is largely equivalent to one already owned.

See also
 Artist's multiple
 Box sets
 Director's cut
 Limited edition books

References

Printmaking
Types of marketing
Versions of works

sv:Edition#Limited Edition (Begränsad upplaga)